General elections were held in the Pitcairn Islands on 11 December 2009. As there are no political parties on Pitcairn, the Deputy Mayor and all four candidates elected to the Island Council were independents. Simon Young became the first person not born on Pitcairn to be elected Deputy Mayor.

Electoral system
The four elected members were elected by single transferable vote for two year terms. In addition, the Island Council had six other members; the Mayor and the Deputy Mayor, both of whom were elected separately. The four elected members and the Deputy Mayor nominated a further member, whilst two were appointed by the Governor and one seat was reserved for a Commissioner liaising between the Governor and the Island Council.

Results
Voting began at 08:30 and was completed by 10:30. Of the 45 registered voters, 40 cast votes, giving a turnout of 88.9%.

Deputy Mayor

Island Council

Following the election, Pawl Warren was appointed to the Island Council by the Governor.

References

Pitcairn
Elections in the Pitcairn Islands
General election
Non-partisan elections
Pitcairn
Pitcairn